Erechthias indicans is a species of moth in the family Tineidae.It was described by Edward Meyrick in 1923. This species is endemic to New Zealand. The holotype specimen of this species was collected by George Vernon Hudson in Karori, Wellington.

References

External links
Image of type specimen of Erechthias indicans

Moths described in 1923
Erechthiinae
Moths of New Zealand
Endemic fauna of New Zealand
Taxa named by Edward Meyrick
Endemic moths of New Zealand